Giddy Up, Giddyup, or Gitty Up may refer to:

Giddy Up (album), a 2001 album by Craig Northey
"Giddy Up", a song by Geggy Tah, 1993
"Giddy Up", a song by NSYNC from NSYNC, 1998
"Giddy Up", a song by Dragonette from Bodyparts, 2012
"Giddy Up", a song by Fe, 2013
"Giddyup", a song by Ricki-Lee Coulter from Dance in the Rain, 2014
"Giddy Up!", a song by Shania Twain from Queen of Me, 2023
"Gitty Up" (song), a song by Salt-n-Pepa from Brand New, 1997

See also
"Giddy On Up", a song by Laura Bell Bundy
"Giddy Up a Ding Dong", a rock and roll song